Brandan Robertson (born June 24, 1992) is a gay writer, activist, minister, and TikTok religious influencer. He has written on the subjects of millennials, social justice, and Progressive Christianity, and he is an LGBTQ activist.

Biography 
He became a "Christian" at the age of 12 in a Baptist church. 

In 2014, he received a Bachelor of Arts from the Moody Bible Institute. 

In September 2014, Robertson was named the national spokesman of "Evangelicals for Marriage Equality", an organization that sought to encourage evangelicals to support civil marriage equality, even if they were unable to support sacramental marriage equality in the church.

In November 2014, Robertson led the effort to convene a historic meeting between Southern Baptist leaders and LGBT+ movement leaders during the Southern Baptist Convention’s Ethics and Religious Liberty Commission’s National Conference in Nashville, Tennessee. This meeting opened the doors for conversations and collaboration between some of the most influential religious leaders in America and leading LGBT+ activists. In 2015, Robertson's work was the subject of an MSNBC documentary film about his work to convince Southern Baptist leaders to support marriage equality.

In February 2015, publisher Destiny Image canceled its book deal with Robertson, citing his support for LGBTQ inclusion. The book was later published.

In March 2016, Robertson wrote an op-ed for Time magazine in which he claimed that he could not "in good conscience, remain aligned with the modern manifestation of the [evangelical] movement." Robertson's writing and work now focus on mindfulness, contemplation, and progressive Christianity, rather than espousing traditional doctrines or dogmas of a particular religious denomination.

In 2017, he also obtained a master's degree from the Iliff School of Theology.

In 2017, he became pastor of the Missiongathering Christian Church (Christian Church (Disciples of Christ)) in San Diego.

In 2022, Robertson began his PhD in Biblical Studies at Drew University.

Personal life 
Robertson previously identified as bisexual, but now identifies himself as gay.

Bibliography 
Building Your Digital Sanctuary (Cascade Books, 2023)
Dry Bones and Holy Wars: A Call for Social and Spiritual Renewal (Orbis Books, 2022)
Filled To Be Emptied: The Path of Liberation for Privileged People (Westminster John Knox Press, 2022)
Nighttime Devotionals For Teen Boys (Rockridge Press, 2021)
Strength In Faith: A 52-Week Devotional For Men (Rockridge Press, 2020)
Nomad: A Spirituality For Traveling Light (Augsburg Books, 2020)
The Gospel of Inclusion: The Christian Case for LGBT+ Inclusion (Cascade Books, 2019)
True Inclusion: Creating Communities of Radical Embrace (Chalice Press, 2018)
Gay and Christian, No Contradiction (Metanoia Media, 2017)
Our Witness: The Unheard Stories of LGBT Christians (Cascade Books, 2017)
Nomad: A Spirituality for Travelling Light (Darton, Longman, and Todd Books, 2016)

References 

American Christian writers
1992 births
American LGBT rights activists
Living people
Moody Bible Institute alumni
People from Elkridge, Maryland
American bisexual writers
Christian Church (Disciples of Christ) clergy
Queer theologians
LGBT people from Maryland
LGBT people from California
21st-century LGBT people